Hyalophysa chattoni is an apostome ciliate of the order Apostomatida. The polymorphic symbiont is carried as an encysted phoront on the exoskeleton of few arthropods belonging to the subphylum Crustacea and undergoes metamorphosis during the host's premolt followed by various other life-cycle stages.

References

Further reading

Oligohymenophorea
Species described in 1966